Actinoptera discoidea is a species of tephritid or fruit flies in the genus Actinoptera of the family Tephritidae.

Distribution
Sweden, France, Central Europe, Ukraine, Caucasus.

References

Tephritinae
Insects described in 1814
Diptera of Europe